Arkady Samoylovich Shaikhet (12 September 1898  18 November  1959) was a prominent Soviet photojournalist and photographer. In the history of Soviet photography, Shaikhet is known for a type of journalistic photography called "artistic reportage," and for photographs of industrialization in the 1920s and 1930s.

His first photographs were published in 1923 and in 1924 he joined the staff of the national magazine Ogonyok. His images were used for their covers from the magazine's first issue. Shaikhet was one of the founders (together with journalist Mikhail Koltsov) of Soviet Photo in 1926. Starting in 1930 he contributed to USSR in Construction, another Soviet journal.

During the Second World War he created a series of images of the Battle of Stalingrad and later of liberation of Kiev, Ukraine.

The Sovfoto agency, which from 1932 distributed Soviet photography in the West, holds examples of his photojournalism.

Exhibitions
2012, Arkadiy Shaikhet, Continuation 1928-1931, Multimedia Art Museum, Moscow

References

External links 

 Arkady Shaykhet photographs

1898 births
1959 deaths
Russian Jews
War photographers
Soviet photographers